The 2010 Kentucky Derby was the 136th running of the Kentucky Derby. The race took place on May 1, 2010, and was televised in the United States on the NBC television network. The post time was  EDT ( UTC). The stakes of the race were US$2,185,200. The race was sponsored by Yum! Brands and hence officially was called Kentucky Derby Presented by Yum! Brands.

Super Saver won the race with Calvin Borel as jockey. Borel became the first jockey to win three Kentucky Derby titles in a four-year span. Ice Box, Paddy O'Prado and Make Music for Me finished second, third and fourth, respectively. Attendance was listed at 155,804, making it the sixth-largest in Derby history.

Payout

The 136th Kentucky Derby Payout Schedule

 $2 Exacta: (4–2)  paid  $152.40
 $1 Trifecta: (4–2–10)  paid  $1,168.70
 $1 Superfecta: (4–2–10–9)  paid  $101,284.60

The field
After early favorite Eskendereya was withdrawn due to a swollen leg the week prior to the 2010 Kentucky Derby, the field was left with no clear favorite.  Lookin At Lucky was the race-time favorite based on his strong form at age two (Del Mar Futurity, Norfolk Stakes and CashCall Futurity), but only at odds of 6-1 against victory. Those odds tied the highest odds for a favorite in the history of the Derby. Super Saver, who had won the Kentucky Jockey Club Stakes at two and finished second in the Arkansas Derby, went off at odds of 8-1. Post positions were drawn Thursday, April 29, 2010.

Results

In what was considered "the most wide-open Derby in years", Super Saver hit the lead at the top of the stretch and held on to win the 136th Kentucky Derby.  Jockey Calvin Borel captured his third Derby win in the last four years, while trainer Todd Pletcher picked up his first Derby victory in 25 tries. 

The track was wet and sloppy due to rain the previous night and nearly all day on Derby Day. After a windy, rain-soaked day at Churchill Downs, the sun came out just shortly before race time. The winning time was 2:04.45, and the margin of victory was listed as  lengths.  Trained by Nick Zito, Ice Box came from well back in the pack to narrowly beat Paddy O'Prado for second place.

Super Saver started the day as the second favorite behind Lookin At Lucky.   Coming out of the No. 4 gate, Borel immediately broke towards the inside rail, a strategy he often employs.  He then pulled the horse back, rounding the final turn in fourth place, and charged to victory along the rail, holding off the impressive late charge from Ice Box on the sloppy track.  It was the horse's first victory since winning the Kentucky Jockey Club Stakes as a two-year-old. Pre-race favorite Lookin At Lucky was hampered by drawing the No. 1 post.  He was pinned on the rail early and did not get adequate running room until it was too late, finishing sixth.

Margins –  lengths, neck
Time – 2:04:45
Track – Sloppy

Exotic wager
Brian Palmer used the "successful $1 bet on the superfecta" in the 2010 Kentucky Derby that "paid a whopping $101,284.60" as an example of the controversial high-risk, high-payout exotic bets that were observed by track-watchers since the 1970s. Palmer compared these horse racing bets to the controversial emerging exotic financial instruments that concerned then-chairman of the Federal Reserve Paul Volcker in 1980. He argued that just as the exotic wagers survived the media controversy so will the exotic options.

Subsequent Grade I wins
Although Super Saver never won another race, several entries recorded subsequent Grade I wins:
 Devil May Care – Mother Goose, Coaching Club American Oaks
 Discretely Mine – King's Bishop Stakes
 Jackson Bend – 2011 Forego Stakes, 2012 Carter Handicap
 Lookin at Lucky – Preakness, Haskell Invitational
 Paddy O'Prado – Secretariat Stakes

Subsequent breeding careers
Leading progeny of participants in the 2010 Kentucky Derby are as follows:
Lookin at Lucky (6th)
 Country House – 2019 Kentucky Derby
 Accelerate – 2018 Breeders' Cup Classic, Santa Anita Handicap, Gold Cup at Santa Anita, Pacific Classic, Awesome Again Stakes
 Wow Cat – Beldame Stakes, Chilean St Leger

Super Saver (1st)
 Runhappy – Breeders' Cup Sprint, King's Bishop Stakes, Malibu Stakes
 Competitive Edge – Hopeful Stakes

Sources: American Classic Pedigrees, Equibase, Blood-Horse Stallion Register

See also

 2010 Preakness Stakes
 2010 Belmont Stakes
 2010 Breeders' Cup

References

External links
 Kentucky Derby official website
 Video replay of the 2010 Kentucky Derby

2010
2010 in horse racing
Derby
May 2010 sports events in the United States